Sarah Jamie Lewis is an anonymity and privacy researcher with a special interest in the privacy protocols (or lack thereof) of sex toys. She has been cited in academic research regarding the security and ethics considerations associated with this technology.

Lewis has shared concerns about the lack of legal framework related to the field of onion dildonics, stating that "We are currently sprinting into this world of connected sex toys and connected sex tech without regards to what consent, privacy, or security means in that context..." and recommending "100% encrypted peer-to-peer cyber sex over tor hidden services." More generally, due to the litigious environment in which computer security researchers operate, she has opted to build bespoke secure systems rather than fix broken systems.

See also

 Crypto-anarchism
 Tor (anonymity network)
 Dark web
 Ricochet (software)

References

External links

Podcast episode on SoundCloud about IoT, SESTA, and Deepfake
The law isn’t ready for the internet of sexual assault: What happens when our most intimate devices get hacked?
Tricky tech questions: Is hacking a sex toy sexual assault?

Year of birth missing (living people)
Living people
Privacy activists
People associated with computer security
Computer security specialists
People in information technology
InfoSec Twitter